Sporades is a genus of ground beetles in the family Carabidae, first described by Charles Adolphe Albert Fauvel in 1882. There are about 12 described species in Sporades, found in New Caledonia.

Species
These 12 species belong to the genus Sporades:

 Sporades beatricis Giachino, 2012
 Sporades daccordii Giachino, 2012
 Sporades jaechi Liebherr, 2020
 Sporades macrops Ueno, 1966
 Sporades millei Giachino, 2012
 Sporades modestior Deuve, 2011
 Sporades perileptoides Donabauer, 2011
 Sporades schuhi Donabauer, 2011
 Sporades sexpunctatus Fauvel, 1882
 Sporades tachysoides Deuve, 2011
 Sporades testaceus Ueno, 1966
 Sporades theryi Deuve, 2011

References

Trechinae